Pathivada Narayanaswamy Naidu is an Indian politician. He was elected six times from the Bhogapuram constituency before it was reconstituted as the Nelimarla constituency.

Personal life
Naidu hometown is Rellivalasa village in Poosapatirega Mandal of Vizianagaram district.

Political life
Naidu was elected to the Andhra Pradesh Legislative Assembly from the Nellimarla (Assembly constituency) of Vijayanagar district in the 2014 general elections. He was elected to the Legislative Assembly from Bhogapuram Assembly constituency 7 times in 1983, 1985, 1989, 1994, 1999 and 2004. He has been elected to the Legislative Assembly seven times since the inception of the Telugu Desam Party, except in the 2009 Assembly elections. He joined the party during the reign of TDP during the reign of Telugudesam party founder Nandamuri Taraka Rama Rao. One-time minister.

Protem speaker
Narasimhan ,Governor of Andhra Pradesh was sworn in as the Protem Speaker of the Andhra Pradesh Legislative Assembly by Pativada Narayanaswamy Naidu at the Raj Bhavan on 20-06-2014

References

Living people
Andhra Pradesh politicians
Telugu Desam Party politicians
People from Vizianagaram
People from Vizianagaram district
People from Uttarandhra
Year of birth missing (living people)